Godinlabe (is a town in Galgaduud region of Galmudug State of Somalia.

Geography
It's 558 km from the capital city of Somalia, Mogadishu and 48 km from the capital of Galgaduud region, Dhusamareb

Demographics
Godinlabe has a population around 50,000 inhabitants. The city is primarily inhabited by people from the Somali ethnic group, with the Habar Gidir well-represented.

Climate
Godinlabe has a hot arid climate. The weather is generally hot, sunny and dry. As other Somali regions, it has two rainy seasons and two dry seasons, each of three months.

Economy
Godinlabe has a really good economy, one of the best in the region. It has a Coca-Cola, mineral bottled water, Sprite, 7up, and Fanta manufacturing plant, it's supplied to many towns/cities in the region and also markets in Godinlabe.

Godinlabe has an Animal trading market, there is a huge market in the city where many types of things are sold and Dodinlabe has many types of livestock such as Camels, Cows and Goats which is shipped to Gulf states from coastal towns/cities in the region.

References

Godinlabe, Somalia

http://allafrica.com/stories/201610130217.html

Populated places in Somalia
Populated places in Mudug
Galmudug